Carlton Hutton Paul Jr. (August 17, 1917 – February 26, 1983) was an American sailor and mechanical engineer. He competed in the mixed 6 metres at the 1936 Summer Olympics. He was the stepson of William Bartholomae Jr., a fellow competitor.

References

1917 births
1983 deaths
Sportspeople from Omaha, Nebraska
Olympic sailors of the United States
Sailors at the 1936 Summer Olympics – 6 Metre
American mechanical engineers
American male sailors (sport)